= Stored energy =

Stored energy may refer to:

- Energy storage, stored energy in any form, including chemical, gravitational and electrical energy
- Potential energy, energy stored in a system of forcefully interacting physical entities
